Jonathan Mirsky (November 14, 1932 – September 5, 2021) was an American journalist and historian of China. The son of molecular biologist Alfred Mirsky and writer Reba Paeff Mirsky, he grew up in New York. He earned his BA in history from Columbia University, and was awarded a PhD in Chinese history from the University of Pennsylvania in 1966 and taught at Dartmouth College. A prominent opponent of the Vietnam War, he did not receive tenure, and left academia for journalism. His coverage of the Tiananmen massacre in 1989 for The Observer won him the international reporter of the year title in the 1989 British Press Awards. His obituary in The Guardian considered that his career "encapsulated the shifts in the way the western left viewed China, from the first decades of communist rule to Beijing’s move to capitalism while still under single-party control," with his work since the 1980s increasingly critical. He died on September 5, 2021, at the age of 88.

References

1932 births
2021 deaths
20th-century American journalists
Columbia College (New York) alumni
The Observer people
University of Pennsylvania alumni